Raoul Edouard Ploquin (20 May 1900 – 29 November 1992) was a French film producer, production manager and screenwriter. He was co-nominated for the Academy Award for Best Story for the film The Sheep Has Five Legs (1954).

Selected filmography
 The Girl and the Boy (1931)
 About an Inquest (1931)
 Court Waltzes (1933)
 The Star of Valencia (1933)
 A Day Will Come (1934)
 Night in May (1934)
 The Devil in the Bottle (1935)
 The Decoy (1935)
 Counsel for Romance (1936)
 S.O.S. Sahara (1938)
 The Strange Monsieur Victor (1938)
 The Mondesir Heir (1940)
 The Woman Who Dared (1944)
 Tuesday's Guest (1950)
 Without Leaving an Address (1951)
 The Sheep Has Five Legs (1954)
 Le Tracassin or Les Plaisirs de la ville (1961)
 Naked Hearts (1966)

External links

References 

French film producers
French male screenwriters
20th-century French screenwriters
1900 births
1992 deaths
20th-century French male writers